Lee Holdsworth (born 2 February 1983) is a semi-retired Australian racing driver. He won the 2021 Bathurst 1000 alongside Chaz Mostert and finished his full-time career after the 2022 season, after nearly two decades of racing. He will be co driving the Walkinshaw Andretti United Optus/Mobil 1 Ford Mustang #25 with Chaz Mostert in 2023 at Sandown Raceway and the Bathurst 1000.

History

Early career
Lee Holdsworth's motorsport career began in go-karts. He started racing cars in 2001 at just 17, when he contested the Commodore Cup national series.

Holdsworth finished fifth in the 2002 Commodore Cup national series and third in the 2003 Commodore Cup championship, before graduating to the Konica Minolta V8 Supercar Series in 2004, driving a Holden VX Commodore for Smiths Trucks Racing.

Holdsworth recorded some impressive results in 2004, including finishing his first-ever round in the top-10 and winning the reverse-grid race at Eastern Creek, as well as finishing third overall in Queensland. Holdsworth also contested the Sandown 500 and Bathurst 1000 V8 Supercar endurance races with Phillip Scifleet and Mark Noske respectively.

In 2005, Holdsworth ran a limited campaign in the renamed HPDC V8 Supercar Development Series and the Australian Formula Ford Championship, as well as contesting the two endurance races with Garry Rogers Motorsport.

Supercars Championship
Holdsworth's big break came in 2006 when he scored a full-time drive with Garry Rogers Motorsport in the V8 Supercar Championship. In 2007, Holdsworth won his first V8 Supercar round at Oran Park. The win came courtesy of consistent driving over the weekend and a good strategy in the final race in changeable conditions.

In 2008 Holdsworth began working with The John Bowe Institute of Driving, helping to teach the techniques of performance driving to the public..Holdsworth moved to Stone Brothers Racing for the 2012 V8 Supercars Championship, ending a six-year association with Garry Rogers Motorsport. For 2013, the team was bought by Erebus Motorsport, and ran Mercedes-Benz E63 AMGs. Holdsworth scored the team's first race win at Winton in April 2014. 

In 2015, Holdsworth moved to Team 18, who operated as a satellite team to the Holden Racing Team. Holdsworth won the 2015 Drivers' Driver award at the 2015 V8 Gala awards.

In 2016, the team was rebranded to Team 18. They also became an independent team, racing a Triple Eight-built Commodore. During Race 13 of the season at the Darwin Triple Crown, Holdsworth sustained fractures to his pelvis, right knee and 2 ribs after an incident on the opening lap. For the next 2 events, Kurt Kostecki substituted for Holdsworth in a spare chassis before the team were able to obtain a brand-new car from Triple Eight. At the Sydney SuperSprint, Holdsworth was still unfit to race, so Enduro Cup driver Karl Reindler drove the car for the event before returning as a co-driver at the Sandown 500 with Holdsworth competing in his first race since his accident. In 2017, Holdsworth continued with Team 18 and finished the season in 16th place with a best finish of 4th place being recorded at the Newcastle 500.

For 2018, Holdsworth will continue with the team and race the new Holden ZB Commodore.

In 2019, Holdsworth rejuvenated his career by signing a multiple year deal to drive for Tickford Racing in the #5 Ford Mustang. In two years with the team, he finished 10th in 2019 and 11th in 2020 points standings before mutually departing Tickford in favour of Jack Le Brocq.

On December 5, 2021 Holdsworth won his first Bathurst 1000, driving alongside Chaz Mostert in the #25 Holden Commodore for Walkinshaw Andretti United.

In his final year of racing, Holdsworth was awarded the Barry Sheene Medal, the first time he had received the award in his career.

Retirement

On 30 August 2022, Holdsworth announced that he would retire from full-time competition at the end of the 2022 season. He stated that he desired to spend more time with his family, while also pursuing a career as a real estate agent. He plans though to return as co-driver for endurance events in the future.

Career results

Career summary

Supercars Championship results

Complete Bathurst 1000 results

TCR Australia results

References

External links 
Lee Holdsworth Profile
Profile at Racing Reference
 

1983 births
Formula Ford drivers
Living people
Racing drivers from Melbourne
Supercars Championship drivers
V8SuperTourer drivers
Bathurst 1000 winners
Garry Rogers Motorsport drivers
Andretti Autosport drivers
United Autosports drivers
Australian Endurance Championship drivers
Audi Sport drivers
Stone Brothers Racing drivers